The 2012 World Sambo Championships was held in Minsk, Belarus between the 8 and 12 November 2012. This tournament included competition in both Sambo, and Combat Sambo.

Medal overview

Combat Sambo Events

Men's Sambo Events

Women's events

Medal table

References

External links 
results

World Sambo Championships
World Sambo Championships, 2006
Sports competitions in Minsk
2012 in sambo (martial art)